The  is an early Heian period setsuwa collection. Written by Kyōkai between 787 and 824, it is Japan's oldest collection of Buddhist setsuwa. It is three volumes in length.

Title
It may also be read as Nihon Reiiki. The book has been translated into English under the title Miraculous Stories from the Japanese Buddhist Tradition, but this does not represent a literal translation of the Japanese title.

Contents
The work is composed of three parts contained within three volumes. Each volume begins with a preface, and the final volume contains an epilogue. There are a total of 116 tales all dealing with Buddhist elements. There are also a total of nine poems.

Manuscripts
There are five existing manuscripts, two of which are designated National Treasures:

 Kōfuku-ji, 904 (National Treasure)
 Raigō-in, late Heian period (National Treasure)
 Shinpuku-ji, Kamakura period
 Sanmai-in, 1214
 Maeda estate, 1236

All manuscripts are incomplete. The full text must be reconstructed from the multiple sources, and this was only possible after the Raigō-in manuscript was discovered in 1973.

Linguistics
The text contains a number of words in man'yōgana, an archaic orthography that may be used to express Jōdai Tokushu Kanazukai. While it is an Early Middle Japanese text, it is early enough to still preserve the distinction between ko1, ko2 and he1, he2 prior to their mergers.

Notes

References

External links 
 日本靈異記 text
 Bibliography (on modern works about the NR)
 Bibliography (Japanese works about)

Setsuwa
Late Old Japanese texts
Heian period in literature
9th-century Japanese books
Japanese Buddhist texts
Books about Buddhism in the Heian period